Reforged – Riding on Fire is the tenth studio album by German heavy/power metal band Iron Savior, which was released on 22 November 2017 in Japan and on 8 December 2017 in Europe as a 2-CD package. The album consists of re-recorded material of the most popular and best songs which dates from the band's 1997 self-titled debut album up until 2004's Battering Ram, when they were signed to Noise Records. It is also the first album to feature new drummer Patrick Klose since he joined in early 2017. The first track "Riding on Fire" was made available for streaming on 2 November 2017 prior of the album's release, followed by "Battering Ram" on 7 December 2017.

Information
Piet Sielck explains that the early albums could not be re-released due to legal reasons but is free to re-record them. He says, "Although we can not re-publish our works from the Noise Records time in the original form, we can re-import them very well. We made use of this possibility and approached the old numbers with much enthusiasm."

Track listing

Personnel
 Iron Savior
Piet Sielck - Vocals, Guitars
Joachim "Piesel" Küstner – Guitars, Backing Vocals
Jan-Sören Eckert - Bass, Backing Vocals
Patrick Klose - Drums
 Additional personnel
Felipe Machado Franco – cover artwork

References

Iron Savior albums
2017 albums
AFM Records albums